Samjeon-dong is a neighbourhood, dong of Songpa-gu, Seoul, South Korea. The name originated from the fact that it once had only three fields.

Education
Schools located in Samjeon-dong:
 Seoul Samjeon Elementary School
 Baemyeong Middle School
 Baemyeong High School

See also
Administrative divisions of South Korea

References

External links
 Samjeon-dong resident center website
 Songpa-gu map

Neighbourhoods of Songpa District